RNA-binding protein PNO1 is a protein that in humans is encoded by the PNO1 gene.

References

Further reading